Aldeşti may refer to several villages in Romania:

 Aldeşti, a village in Bârsa Commune, Arad County
 Aldeşti, a village in Berești-Meria Commune, Galaţi County
 Aldeşti, a village in Golești, Vâlcea